On 3 January 2021, the French Armed Forces carried out an airstrike targeting a wedding claiming that terrorists were killed without any collateral damage. A UN report later revealed that out of the 22 people killed, 19 were civilians (almost all of them).

Background
On 2 January 2021, in coordination with the militaries of Mali, Burkina Faso, and Niger the French military launched Operation Eclipse in and around the city of Boni.

The Airstike
On 3 January 2021, Islamic extremists confronted a wedding in the village of Bounti in Mopti Region, central Mali, ordering the attendees to separate by gender. A fighter jet airstrike then killed 22 people, including children, according to witnesses and local officials including the mayor.

Residents also said a helicopter opened fire on the ceremony. The French Armed Forces said they had killed "dozens" of militant Islamists in Hombori, a few kilometers away, on that day, but that a connection between the strike and a wedding party "does not correspond to information collected prior to the airstrike".

On 30 March 2021, the MINUSMA United Nations peacekeeping mission in Mali concluded that the strike killed 19 unarmed civilians and three armed men. They said the strike was on a wedding attended by about 100 civilians and five armed men, presumably members of a group affiliated with al-Qaeda.  

The French military maintains its version of events, and called the UN report "biased".

References

Wedding airstrike
2021 airstrikes
2021 in international relations
Airstrikes conducted by France
Airstrikes in Africa
Attacks on weddings
Wedding airstrike
January 2021 crimes in Africa
January 2021 events in Africa
Wedding airstrike
Mopti Region
Wedding airstrike
French war crimes